Broadford or Broad Ford is an unincorporated community in Connellsville Township, Fayette County, Pennsylvania southeast of Pittsburgh in the United States.  Broadford is on the Youghiogheny River downstream from Connellsville.  Galley Run, a tributary to the Youghiogheny River, joins here.

History
Broadford was formerly the site of an A. Overholt and Company Distillery, maker of Old Overholt rye whiskey once run by Pittsburgh industrialist H. Clay Frick.  (The other was at West Overton, Pennsylvania.)  Ruins and some extant buildings are present in the town.

Broadford was also once the junction of the Pittsburgh & Connellsville Railroad which ran along the Youghiogheny and the Mount Pleasant & Broad Ford Railroad spur to Mount Pleasant (both railroads later part of B&O, now CSX). Today, Amtrak's Capitol Limited operates through Broadford, before stopping in Connellsville.

The town experienced a coal mining and coke production boom in the early 20th century but, by the middle of the century, the distillery, which had survived Prohibition distilling medical spirits was the only major employer.  National Distillers Products Corporation, which acquired the distillery in 1933, later shut it down and moved Old Overholt production to Cincinnati, Ohio.

References

External links
Broad Ford Aerial History
Broad Ford Dismantled with photos of the Overholt distillery
Henry Clay Mine & Coke Works formerly of Broad Ford

Unincorporated communities in Pennsylvania
Pittsburgh metropolitan area
Unincorporated communities in Fayette County, Pennsylvania